Fazli Chalabi Fuzulizade (1543 – 1605), commonly known as Fazli, was a 16th-century Azerbaijani poet. He wrote in Azerbaijani, Persian, and Arabic and was the son of the major Azerbaijani poet Fuzuli. Fazli was best known for his talent in creating chronograms and riddles within his poems.

Name 
According to professor of Turkish literature, Filiz Kılıç, Fazli's full name was Fazli Chalabi Fuzulizade. His pen name, Fazli, means "belonging to munificence or abundance" and is likely a tribute to the pen name of his father, the poet Fuzuli.

Biography 
Fazli's exact date of birth is uncertain, but it must have been before 1556 when his father passed away. Poet Ahdi's Tezkire in 1563/64 described him as a mature poet, suggesting that he was born around 1543. Fazli received much of his poetic education from his father. It is believed that he died in 1605.

Poetry 
Fazli is recognised as a minor poet due to the limited amount and quality of his work. He wrote verses in Azerbaijani, Persian, and Arabic in the aruz form (poetry using quantifying prosody). His poetry is characterized by a notable degree of creativity. According to Ahdi, Fazli was more interested in secular knowledge than religious studies. In one of his qitas, he expresses support for Sunni beliefs and opposition to Qizilbash views. Fazli is most renowned for his exceptional ability to create chronograms and riddles within his poems. His qoshma (non-religious verse form) poems are also believed to have inspired later Turkic poets from Azerbaijan.

References

Sources

External links 
 

Azerbaijani poets
Arabic-language poets
Persian-language poets
1543 births
1605 deaths